Valentino Castellani (born 19 March 1940) was the independent Mayor of Turin, Italy, from 24 June 1993 to 1 June 2001.

He is also a noted university professor and alumni of the Polytechnic University of Turin, where he got a master's degree in electronic engineering in 1963. Three years later, in 1966, he got his master's degree in electrical engineering at the MIT, in Boston. He is the author of some 70 scientific publications, some of which deal with the theory of transmission and coding applied to satellites and mobile communication.
From 1999 to 2006 he was President of the Turin Organizing Committee, the organizing committee of the 2006 Winter Olympics in Turin.

He has lived in Turin for over forty years, is married and has three children.

References

External Links 

|-

1940 births
Living people
People from Varmo
Mayors of Turin
2006 Winter Olympics
Presidents of the Organising Committees for the Olympic Games
Polytechnic University of Turin alumni
Recipients of the Olympic Order